Nord Anglia International School Rotterdam (NAISR) is an International school in Hillegersberg, Netherlands, an area of Rotterdam. The school educates students from 3–18 years of age and has three academic areas: Early Years, Primary School and Secondary School.

Description
NAISR (previously American International School of Rotterdam) was founded in 1959 to educate the post-war growth of American families brought to the area by the U.S. Military and international business. Over the following fifty years, the military presence in the area declined and the school has focused on becoming a more internationally minded school catering for a much more culturally-diverse population.

NAISR is a member of the Northwest European Council of International Schools (NECIS) and is fully accredited by the New England Association of Schools and Colleges (NEASC) and the Council of International Schools (CIS). NAISR is also an IB World School.

See also 
Stichting William K. Gordon Scholarship Fund

External Links
 Nord Anglia International School Rotterdam web site

References

1959 establishments in the Netherlands
Educational institutions established in 1959
Nord Anglia Education
International schools in the Netherlands
International Baccalaureate schools in the Netherlands
Schools in Rotterdam